Callityrinthia mimetica is a species of beetle in the family Cerambycidae, and the only species in the genus Callityrinthia. It was described by Galileo and Martins in 1991.

References

Monotypic Cerambycidae genera
Calliini
Beetles described in 1991